This is a list of astronauts, who are in a restricted sense, Asians.

If "Asian" is restricted  to refer to people from the continent of Asia, exclusive of Asian Russia, who are not of predominantly European, African, or American ancestry, then the list is as follows:

The first country listed is that of citizenship; the second, if any, is that of the Asian country of birth and/or ancestry, where different.

The list is divided between those astronauts whose origin or ancestry is in West or South Asia (Afghanistan, Azerbaijan, Georgia, India, Israel, Iran, Saudi Arabia, Syria) and those whose origin or ancestry is in East or Central Asia (Mongolia, Japan, Kazakhstan, Korea, Kyrgyzstan, Malaysia, China, Vietnam).

East and Central Asia

West and South Asia

Other Asian-born astronauts
Several Soviet and Russian cosmonauts of Russian ethnicity, and some American astronauts not of Asian ancestry, were born in Asian Russia and other parts of Asia:
Born in Asian Russia — Dmitri Kondratyev, Vasili Lazarev, Alexei Leonov, Aleksandr Poleshchuk, Nikolai Rukavishnikov, Valery Ryumin, Vitali Sevastyanov, Maksim Surayev, Gherman Titov, Vladimir Titov, Pavel Vinogradov, Boris Volynov.
Born in Kazakhstan — Yuri Lonchakov, Viktor Patsayev, Vladimir Shatalov, Aleksandr Viktorenko
Born in Turkmenistan — Oleg Kononenko
Born in Uzbekistan — Vladimir Dzhanibekov
Born in China — William Anders, Shannon Lucid
Born in Taiwan - Kjell N. Lindgren (American by nationality, and half Taiwanese)

See also
List of Asian American astronauts

Asian